Jeffrey Bartlett Taliaferro is a retired United States Air Force major general who last served as the vice director for operations of the Joint Staff.

References 

Living people
Year of birth missing (living people)
Place of birth missing (living people)
United States Air Force generals
Major generals